Simcoe Place is an office building and shopping centre in Toronto, Ontario, Canada. The tower is  metres (486 feet) with 33 floors. It was completed by architects Carlos Ott and NORR in 1995. The late-Modernist building was built by developer Cadillac Fairview. It was the only major office tower built in Toronto during the mid-1990s, a period between the early decade real estate bubble and the building boom of the 21st century.

As a special project The Globe and Mail reporter Mary Gooderham spent two years covering the construction, writing 110 columns on the subject. These were later compiled into a book titled A Building Goes Up: The Making of a Skyscraper.

It is the head office for Workplace Safety & Insurance Board. It is adjacent to the CBC National Broadcast Centre and was built as the commercial component of the complex. The design was the subject of a design competition, won by Norr Architects and Ott.

See also
 Canadian Broadcasting Centre

References

Further reading

External links
 
 

Skyscrapers in Toronto
Carlos Ott buildings
Cadillac Fairview
Skyscraper office buildings in Canada
Retail buildings in Canada
Commercial buildings completed in 1995
Office buildings completed in 1995